John Houlton Marshall (9 October 1768 in Halifax, Nova Scotia – 2 May 1837 in Charlotte Street, Bloomsbury Square, Middlesex) was a Nova Scotian who was a naval officer at the Battle of Trafalgar during the Napoleonic Wars.

Career 
John Houlton Marshall was the son of Elias Marshall, master shipwright, of H.M. Careening Yard, Halifax. He entered the Royal Navy in 1778. He was promoted to lieutenant on 30 June 1794 and by 1799 was serving as first lieutenant of the 38-gun frigate HMS Naiad. As such he fought at the Action of 16 October 1799 where Naiad and three other British frigates captured two Spanish frigates which were transporting large amounts of treasure. Marshall was still serving in Naiad on 17 May 1801 when he commanded a cutting out expedition at Pontevedra which captured the Spanish packet l'Alcudia and destroyed her consort El Raposo. On 13 July 1804 he joined the 100-gun ship of the line , and he fought on board her at the Battle of Trafalgar on 21 October 1805. His share of the prize money was 65 pounds 11s 5d plus a Parliamentary Award of 161 pounds.

He was later given command of the 18-gun brig-sloop , and survived her sinking on 19 May 1814 on reef rocks in Anato Bay, Jamaica.

See also 
 Military history of Nova Scotia

Citations

References

External links
  Montreal Gazette 1942
  Archives Canada - Marshall

1768 births
1837 deaths
British naval commanders of the Napoleonic Wars
Royal Navy personnel of the War of 1812